Interference is the first album released by the Florida-based hard rock music group, Crease. This album was released in 1995, via DM Records. Interference earned Crease a Jammy Award nomination from JAM magazine for “Best Independent Release of the Year for the State for Florida”

Track listing
 "Curiosity"  – 2:11
 "I Shouldn't Think This Way"  – 2:55
 "Bored"  – 3:10
 "I Don't Think So" – 2:46
 "In This Life"  – 2:30
 "Manhole"  – 2:27
 "Determined"  – 2:59
 "Spiritual Bliss"  – 2:37
 "Face"  – 3:04
 "Blue Skies"  – 2:33
 "Red"  – 2:46
 "It Doesn't Matter"  – 3:05

Personnel
Crease:
Kelly Meister - lead vocals
Fritz Dorigo - guitars, vocals
Greg Gershengorn - bass, vocals
Eric Dorigo - drums, percussion

References

External links
http://www.artistdirect.com/nad/store/artist/album/0,,214221,00.html

1995 albums